This is a list of the cicadas found in Australia including its outlying islands and territories. The outlying islands covered include: Christmas, Cocos (Keeling), Ashmore, Torres Strait, Coral Sea, Lord Howe, Norfolk, Macquarie, and Heard/McDonald.

The taxonomy followed is from Moulds 2012, Marshall 2018, and Popple 2018.

Family Cicadidae Latreille, 1802

Subfamily Cicadinae Latreille, 1802

Tribe Burbungini Moulds, 2005

Genus Burbunga Distant, 1905
 Burbunga albofasciata Distant, 1907 (Pale Bark Cicada)
 Burbunga aterrima (Distant, 1914) (Western Bark Cicada)
 Burbunga gilmorei (Distant, 1882) (Desert Screamer)
 Burbunga hillieri (Distant, 1907) (Small Western Bark Cicada)
 Burbunga inornata Distant, 1905 (Mareeba Bark Cicada)
 Burbunga mouldsi Olive, 2012 (Charcoal Screamer)
 Burbunga nanda (Burns, 1964) (Black-spot Screamer)
 Burbunga nigrosignata (Distant 1904) (South-western Whiner)
 Burbunga occidentalis (Distant, 1912) (Small Northern Bark Cicada)
 Burbunga parva Moulds, 1994 (Queensland Bark Cicada)
 Burbunga queenslandica Moulds, 1994

Tribe Cicadini Latreille

Genus Diceropyga Stål, 1870
 Dyceropyga subapicalis (Walker, 1868) (Australian Dicer)

Tribe Cryptotympanini Handlirsch, 1925

Genus Anapsaltoda Ashton, 1921
 Anapsaltoda pulchra Ashton, 1921 (Golden Emperor)

Genus Arenopsaltria Ashton, 1921 (Sandgrinders)
 Arenopsaltria fullo (Walker, 1850) (Sandgrinder)
 Arenopsaltria nubivena (Walker, 1858) (Eastern Sandgrinder)
 Arenopsaltria pygmaea (Distant, 1904) (Pygmy Sandgrinder)

Genus Henicopsaltria Stål, 1866

 Henicopsaltria danielsi Moulds, 1993 (McIvor River Grinder)
 Henicopsaltria eydouxii (Guérin-Méneville, 1838) (Razor Grinder)
 Henicopsaltria kelsalli Distant, 1910 (Cape York Grinder)
 Henicopsaltria rufivelum Moulds, 1978 (Jungle Grinder)

Genus Illyria Moulds, 1985
 Illyria australensis (Kirkaldy, 1909) (Semi-arid Rattler)
 Illyria burkei (Goding and Froggatt, 1904)
 Illyria hilli (Ashton, 1921) (Northern Rattler)
 Illyria major Moulds, 1985 (Desert Rattler)

Genus Macrotristria Stål, 1870

 Macrotristria angularis (Germar, 1834) (Cherrynose)
 Macrotristria bindalia Burns, 1964 (Corroboree Cicada)
 Macrotristria doddi Ashton, 1912 (Darwin Whiner)
 Macrotristria dorsalis Ashton, 1912 (Little Whiner)
 Macrotristria douglasi Burns, 1964 (Kimberley Whiner)
 Macrotristria extrema (Distant, 1892) (Western Whiner)
 Macrotristria frenchi (Distant, 1892) (Northern Steamer)
 Macrotristria godingi Distant, 1907 (Tiger Cherrynose)
 Macrotristria hieroglyphicalis (Kirkaldy, 1909) (Derby Whiner)
 Macrotristria intersecta (Walker, 1850) (Corroboree Cicada)
 Macrotristria kabikabia Burns, 1964 (Black Cherrynose)
 Macrotristria kulungura Burns, 1964 (Coastal Whiner)
 Macrotristria lachlani Moulds, 1992 (Far Northern Cherrynose)
 Macrotristria maculicollis Ashton, 1914 (False Cherrynose)
 Macrotristria stevewilsoni Popple, 2016 (Shoalwater Cherrynose)
 Macrotristria sylvara (Distant, 1901) (Green Cherrynose)
 Macrotristria thophoides Ashton, 1914 (False Drummer)
 Macrotristria vittata Moulds, 1992 (Cape York Cherrynose)
 Macrotristria worora Burns, 1964 (Kimberley Whiner)

Genus Neopsaltoda Distant, 1910
 Neopsaltoda crassa Distant, 1910 (Dark Knight)

Genus Psaltoda Stål, 1861

 Psaltoda adonis Ashton, 1914 (Forest Demon)
 Psaltoda antennetta Moulds, 2002 (Clubbed Sage)
 Psaltoda aurora Distant, 1881 (Red Roarer)
 Psaltoda brachypennis Moss and Moulds, 2000 (Phantom Knight)
 Psaltoda claripennis Ashton, 1921 (Clanger)
 Psaltoda flavescens Distant, 1892 (Golden Knight)
 Psaltoda fumipennis Ashton, 1912 (Smoky Sage)
 Psaltoda harrisii (Leach, 1814) (Yellowbelly)
 Psaltoda insularis Ashton, 1914 (Lord Howe Island Cicada)
 Psaltoda maccallumi Moulds, 2002 (Dark Sage)
 Psaltoda magnifica Moulds, 1984 (Green Baron)
 Psaltoda moerens (Germar, 1834) (Redeye)
 Psaltoda mossi Moulds, 2002 (Little Baron)
 Psaltoda pictibasis (Walker, 1858) (Black Friday)
 Psaltoda plaga (Walker, 1850) (Silver Knight)

Tribe Cyclochilini Distant, 1904

Genus Cyclochila * Amyot and Serville, 1843

 Cyclochila australasiae (Donovan, 1805) (Greengrocer/Masked Devil/Yellow Monday)
 Cyclochila virens Distant, 1906 (Northern Greengrocer)

Tribe Jassopsaltriini Moulds, 2005

Genus Jassopsaltria Ashton, 1914
 Jassopsaltria rufifacies Ashton, 1914 (Green Fizzer)

Tribe Platypleurini Schmidt, 1918

Genus Oxypleura * Amyot and Serville, 1843
 Oxypleura calypso (Kirby, 1889) (Christmas Island Cicada)

Tribe Talcopsaltriini Moulds, 2008

Genus Talcopsaltria Moulds, 2008
 Talcopsaltria olivei Moulds, 2008 (Tetradonta Cicada)

Tribe Tamasini Moulds, 2005

Genus Parnkalla Distant, 1905
 Parnkalla muelleri (Distant, 1882) (Grass Faerie)

Genus Parnquila Moulds, 2012
 Parnquila hillieri (Distant, 1906) (Cane Grass Buzzer)
 Parnquila magna (Distant, 1913) (Goldfields Buzzer)
 Parnquila venosa (Distant, 1907) (Spinifex Buzzer)
 Parnquila unicolor (Ashton, 1921) (Perth Buzzer)

Genus Tamasa Distant, 1905

 Tamasa burgessi (Distant, 1905) (Two-toned Bunyip)
 Tamasa caverna Moulds and Olive, 2014 (Boulder Bunyip)
 Tamasa doddi (Goding and Froggatt, 1904) (Dodd's Bunyip)
 Tamasa rainbowi Ashton, 1912 (Green Bunyip)
 Tamasa tristigma (Germar, 1834) (Eastern Bunyip)

Tribe Thophini Distant, 1904

Genus Arunta Distant, 1904
 Arunta interclusa (Walker, 1858) (Mangrove Drummer)
 Arunta perulata (Guérin-Méneville, 1831) (White Drummer)

Genus Thopha * Amyot and Serville, 1843
 Thopha colorata Distant, 1907 (Orange Drummer)
 Thopha emmotti Moulds, 2001 (Desert Double Drummer)
 Thopha hutchinsoni Moulds, 2008 (North-western Double Drummer)
 Thopha saccata (Fabricius, 1803) (Eastern Double Drummer)
 Thopha sessiliba Distant, 1892 (Northern Double Drummer)

Subfamily Cicadettinae Buckton, 1889

Tribe Cicadettini Buckton, 1889

Genus Adelia Moulds, 2012
 Adelia borealis (Goding and Froggatt, 1904)Broad-winged Tiger

Genus Atrapsalta <small>* Owen & Moulds, 2016</small>
 Atrapsalta collina (Ewart, 1989) (Sandstone Squeaker)
 Atrapsalta corticina (Ewart, 1989) (Bark Squeaker)
 Atrapsalta dolens (Walker, 1850) (South-western Bark Squeaker)
 Atrapsalta emmotti (Owen & Moulds, 2016) (Channel Country Squeaker)
 Atrapsalta encaustica (Germar, 1834) (Black Squeaker)
 Atrapsalta furcilla Owen & Moulds, 2016 (Southern Mountain Squeaker)
 Atrapsalta fuscata (Ewart, 1989) (Small Bark Squeaker)
 Atrapsalta siccana (Ewart, 1989) (Bulloak Squeaker)
 Atrapsalta vinea Owen & Moulds, 2016 (Clare Valley Squeaker)
 Pauropsalta rubra Goding & Froggatt, 1904 (Sale Squeaker)

Genus Auscala Moulds, 2012
 Auscala spinosa (Goding & Froggatt, 1904) (Creaking Branch Cicada)

Genus Birrima Distant, 1906

 Birrima castanea (Goding & Froggatt, 1904) (Red Tree-ticker)
 Birrima varians (Germar, 1834) (Black Tree-ticker)

Genus Caliginopsalta Ewart, 2005
 Caliginopsalta percola Ewart, 2005 (Royal Casuarina Ticker)

Genus Chelapsalta Moulds, 2012
 Chelapsalta puer (Walker, 1850) (Cassinia Cicada)
 Chelapsalta myoporae Ewart, Popple and Marshall, 2015 (Copper Shrub-buzzer)

Genus Clinata Moulds, 2012
 Clinata nodicosta (Goding & Froggatt, 1904) (Western Bent-winged Clicker)

Genus Clinopsalta Moulds, 2012
 Clinopsalta adelaida (Ashton, 1914) (Murray Acacia Cicada)
 Clinopsalta autumna Popple & Emery, 2017 (Ferny Acacia Cicada)
 Clinopsalta tigris (Ashton, 1914) (Small Acacia Cicada)
 Clinopsalta semilunata Popple & Emery, 2017 (Semilunata Cicada)

Genus Crotopsalta Ewart, 2005
 Crotopsalta fronsecetes Ewart, 2005 (Eastern Ticker)
 Crotopsalta plexis Ewart, 2005 (Wilga Ticker)
 Crotopsalta strenulum Ewart, 2005 (Rapid Ticker)
 Crotopsalta poaecetes Ewart, 2005 (Cloncurry Ticker)
 Crotopsalta leptotigris Ewart, 2009 (Cravens Peak Ticker)

Genus Diemeniana Distant, 1905

 Diemeniana cincta (Fabricius, 1803) (Tasman Twanger)
 Diemeniana euronotiana (Kirkaldy, 1909) (Golden Twanger)
 Diemeniana frenchi (Distant, 1907) (Crop Duster)
 Diemeniana hirsuta (Goding & Froggatt, 1904) (Black Twanger)
 Diemeniana neboissi Burns, 1958 (Auburn Crop Duster)

Genus Dipsopsalta Moulds, 2012
 Dipsopsalta signata (Distant, 1914) (Desert Grass-buzzer)

Genus Drymopsalta Ewart, 2005
 Drymopsalta acrotela Ewart & Popple, 2013 (Top End Heath-buzzer)
 Drymopsalta crepitum Ewart, 2005 (Cape York Heath-buzzer)
 Drymopsalta daemeli (Distant, 1905) (Brown Heath-buzzer)
 Drymopsalta hobsoni Ewart & Popple, 2013 (Inglewood Heath-buzzer)
 Drymopsalta wallumi Ewart & Popple, 2013 (Wallum Heath-buzzer)

Genus Erempsalta Moulds, 2012
 Erempsalta hermannsbergensis (Distant, 1907) (Turkey Bush Cicada)

Genus Ewartia Moulds, 2012
 Ewartia brevis (Ashton, 1912) (Varnished Cicada)
 Ewartia carina Popple, 2017 (Cape York Wattle Cicada)
 Ewartia cuensis (Distant, 1913) (Western Wattle Cicada)
 Ewartia etesia Popple, 2017 (Northern Wattle Cicada)
 Ewartia lapidosa Popple, 2017 (Inland Wattle Cicada)
 Ewartia oldfieldi (Distant, 1883) (Wattle Cicada)
 Ewartia roberti Popple, 2017 (Thin-striped Wattle Cicada)
 Ewartia thamna Popple, 2017 (Shrub Wattle Cicada)

Genus Falcatpsalta * Owen and Moulds, 2016
 Falcatpsalta aquilus (Ewart, 1989) (Sooty Squeaker)

Genus Froggattoides Distant, 1910
 Froggattoides pallidus (Ashton, 1912) (Western Bent-wing)
 Froggattodies typicus Distant, 1910 (Eastern Bent-wing)

Genus Gagatopsalta Ewart, 2005
 Gagatopsalta obscura Ewart, 2005 (Clip-clop Cicada)
 Gagatopsalta auranti Ewart, 2005 (Painted Brigalow Ticker)

Genus Galanga Moulds, 2012

 Galanga labeculata (Distant 1882) (Double-spotted Cicada)

Genus Gelidea Moulds, 2012
 Gelidea torrida (Erichson, 1842) (Southern Spotted Cicada)

Genus Graminitigrina Ewart and Marques, 2008
 Graminitigrina aurora Ewart, Popple and Hill, 2017 (Emerald Grass-ticker)
 Graminitigrina bolloni Ewart and Marques, 2008 (Southern Grass-clicker )
 Graminitigrina bowensis Ewart and Marques, 2008 (Northern Grass-clicker)
 Graminitigrina carnarvonensis Ewart and Marques, 2008 (Maranoa Grass-clicker)
 Graminitigrina einasleighi Ewart, Popple and Hill, 2017 (Ornamental Grass-clicker)
 Graminitigrina flindensis Ewart, Popple and Hill, 2017 (Hughenden Grass-clicker)
 Graminitigrina karumbae Ewart and Marques, 2008 (Far Northern Grass-clicker)
 Graminitigrina selwynensis Ewart, Popple and Hill, 2017 (Selwyn Range Grass-clicker)
 Graminitigrina triodiae Ewart and Marques, 2008 (Central Grass-clicker)
 Graminitigrina uluruensis Ewart, Popple and Hill, 2017 (Uluru Grass-clicker)

Genus Gudanga Distant, 1905
 Gudanga adamsi Moulds, 1996 (Northern Brigalow Blackwing)
 Gudanga aurea Moulds, 1996 (Golden Blackwing)
 Gudanga boulayi Distant, 1905 (Red Blackwing)
 Gudanga browni (Distant, 1913) (Orange Blackwing)
 Gudanga emmotti Ewart and Popple, 2013 (Noonbah Blackwing)
 Gudanga kalgoorliensis Moulds, 1996 (Kalgoorlie Blackwing)
 Gudanga lithgowae Ewart and Popple, 2013 (Southern Brigalow Blackwing)
 Gudanga nowlandi Ewart and Popple, 2013 (Mulga Blackwing)
 Gudanga pterolongata Olive, 2007 (Croydon Blackwing)
 Gudanga solata Moulds, 1996 (Dark Red Blackwing)

Genus Haemopsalta * Owen and Moulds, 2016
 Haemopsalta aktites (Ewart, 1989) (Beach Squeaker)
 Haemopsalta flammeata Owen and Moulds, 2016 (Sunray Squeaker)
 Haemopsalta georgina Owen and Moulds, 2016 (Tasmanian Squeaker)
 Haemopsalta rubea (Goding and Froggatt, 1904) (Red Squeaker)

Genus Heliopsalta Moulds, 2012
 Heliopsalta polita (Popple, 2003) (Enamel Cicada)

Genus Heremusina Ewart, 2018
 Heremusina pipatio Ewart, 2018 (Cloncurry Watch-winder)
 Heremusina udeoecetes Ewart, 2018 (Alice Springs Watch-winder)

Genus Kikihia Dugdale, 1972
 Kikihia convicta (Distant, 1892) (Norfolk Island Cicada)

Genus Kobonga Distant, 1906
 Kobonga apicans Moulds and Kopestonsky, 2001 (Northern Robust Clicker)
 Kobonga apicata (Ashton, 1914) (Western Clicker)
 Kobonga froggatti Distant, 1913 (Maroon Clicker )
 Kobonga fuscomarginata (Distant, 1914) (Slow Dinger)
 Kobonga godingi (Distant, 1905) (Southern Robust Clicker)
 Kobonga oxleyi (Distant, 1882) (Moree Dinger)
 Kobonga umbrimargo (Walker, 1858) (Orange Clicker)

Genus Limnopsalta Moulds, 2012
 Limnopsalta stradbrokensis (Distant, 1915) (Wallum Sedge-clicker)

Genus Marteena Moulds, 1986
Mallee Chirper * Marteena rubricincta (Goding and Froggatt, 1904)

Genus Mugadina Moulds, 2012
 Mugadina emma (Goding and Froggatt) (Amber Grass-ticker)
 Mugadina marshalli (Distant, 1911) (Yellow Grass-ticker)

Genus Myopsalta Moulds, 2012
 Myopsalta albiventris Popple, 2017 (Pale-bellied Grass Buzzer)
 Myopsalta atrata (Goding and Froggatt, 1904) (Orange-bellied Buzzer)
 Myopsalta bassiana Popple, 2017 (Bassian Buzzer)
 Myopsalta binotata (Goding and Froggatt, 1904) (Robust Smoky Buzzer)
 Myopsalta chrysopedia Popple, 2017 (Black Sandplain Buzzer)
 Myopsalta coolahensis Emery, Emery and Popple, 2015 (Coolah Grass Buzzer)
 Myopsalta crucifera (Ashton, 1914) (Brown Buzzer)
 Myopsalta gordoni Popple, 2017 (Black Acacia Buzzer)
 Myopsalta leona Popple, 2017 (Black Brigalow Buzzer)
 Myopsalta longicauda Popple, 2017 (Wavering Buzzer)
 Myopsalta riverina Popple, 2017 (Eastern Mallee Buzzer)
 Myopsalta septa Popple, 2017 (Warwick Grass Buzzer)
 Myopsalta lactea (Distant, 1905) (Dark Smoky Buzzer)
 Myopsalta libritor Emery, Emery and Popple, 2015 (Coolah Repeater)
 Myopsalta mackinlayi (Distant, 1882) (Fence Buzzer)
 Myopsalta majurae Popple, 2017 (Mt Ainslie Buzzer)
 Myopsalta melanobasis Popple, 2017 (Broad-winged Buzzer)
 Myopsalta parvula Popple, 2017 (Black Mountain Tinkler)
 Myopsalta platyptera Popple, 2017 (Theodore Chirper)
 Myopsalta umbra Popple, 2017 (Olive Vine Buzzer)
 Myopsalta waterhousei (Distant, 1905) (Smoky Buzzer)
 Myopsalta wollomombii (Coombs, 1995) (New England Grass Buzzer)
 Myopsalta xerograsidia Popple, 2017 (Fishing Reel Buzzer)

Genus Nanopsalta Moulds, 2012
 Nanopsalta basalis (Goding and Froggatt, 1904) (Paperbark Tree-buzzer)

Genus Neopunia Moulds, 2012
 Neopunia graminis (Goding and Froggatt, 1904) (Fluoro Grass Pixie)

Genus Noongara Moulds, 2012
 Noongara issoides (Distant, 1905) (Perth Stubby-wing)

Genus Palapsalta Moulds, 2012
 Palapsalta belli Emery, Emery and Hutchinson, 2018 (Pilbara Tree-buzzer)
 Palapsalta circumdata (Walker, 1852) (Bronze Tree-buzzer)
 Palapsalta eyrei (Distant, 1882) (Yellow Tree-buzzer)
 Palapsalta ligneocauda Emery, Emery and Hutchinson, 2018 (Lime Tree-buzzer)
 Palapsalta palaga Owen and Moulds, 2016 (Northern River Tree-buzzer)
 Palapsalta serpens Owen and Moulds, 2016 (Pale-sided Tree-buzzer)
 Palapsalta virgulata (Ewart, 1989) (Striped Tree-buzzer)
 Palapsalta vitellina (Ewart, 1989) (Eastern River Tree-buzzer)

Genus Paradina Moulds, 2012
 Paradina leichardti (Distant, 1882) (Black Grass-ticker)

Genus Pauropsalta * Goding and Froggatt, 1904
 Pauropsalta accola Owen and Moulds, 2016 (Subcoastal Squawker)
 Pauropsalta adelphe Owen and Moulds, 2016 (Top End Frog Squawker)
 Pauropsalta agasta Owen and Moulds, 2016 (Kimberley Frog Squawker)
 Pauropsalta borealis Goding and Froggatt, 1904 (Little Orange Squawker)
 Pauropsalta castanea Goding and Froggatt, 1904 (Flinders Squawker)
 Pauropsalta confinis Owen and Moulds, 2016 (Seismic Squawker)
 Pauropsalta conflua Owen and Moulds, 2016 (Small Mallee Squawker)
 Pauropsalta contigua Owen and Moulds, 2016 (Oven Squawker)
 Pauropsalta elgneri (Ashton, 1912) (Cape York Galloper)
 Pauropsalta ewarti Owen and Moulds, 2016 (Herberton Squawker)
 Pauropsalta extensa Goding and Froggatt, 1904 (Slender Squawker)
 Pauropsalta extrema (Distant, 1892) (Typewriter)
 Pauropsalta herveyensis Owen and Moulds, 2016 (Herveys Range Squawker)
 Pauropsalta infrasila Moulds, 1987 (Tropical Orange Squawker)
Large Mallee Squawker * Pauropsalta infuscata (Goding and Froggatt, 1904)
 Pauropsalta juncta Owen and Moulds, 2016 (Stirling Squawker)
 Pauropsalta katherina Owen and Moulds, 2016 (Kathy's Squawker)
 Pauropsalta kriki Owen and Moulds, 2016 (River Galloper)
 Pauropsalta melanopygia Germar, 1834) (Strident Sqawker)
 Pauropsalta mneme (Walker, 1850) (Alarm Clock Squawker)
 Pauropsalta opaca Ewart, 1989 (Fairy Dust Squawker)
 Pauropsalta prolongata Goding and Froggatt, 1904 (Slender Squawker)
 Pauropsalta similis Owen and Moulds, 2016 (Kimberley Squawker)
 Pauropsalta sinavilla Owen and Moulds, 2016 (Pilbara Squawker)
 Pauropsalta walkeri Moulds and Owen, 2011 (Normanton Squawker)

Genus Physeema Moulds, 2012
 Physeema bellatrix (Ashton, 1914) (Esperance Ticker)
 Physeema convergens (Walker, 1850) (Duke)
 Physeema labyrinthica (Walker, 1850) (Southern Coastal Ticker)
 Physeema latorea (Walker, 1850) (Northern Sandplain Ticker)
 Physeema quadricincta (Walker, 1850) (Tick-tock)

Genus Pipilopsalta Ewart, 2005
 Pipilopsalta ceuthoviridis Ewart, 2005 (Green Desert Ticker)

Genus Platypsalta Moulds, 2012
 Platypsalta dubia (Goding and Froggatt, 1904) (Black Scrub-buzzer)
 Platypsalta mixta (Distant, 1914) (Black Scrub-buzzer)

Genus Plerapsalta Moulds, 2012
 Plerapsalta incipiens (Walker, 1850) (Tiny Ambertail)
 Plerapsalta multifascia (Walker, 1850) (Neon Ambertail)

Genus Popplepsalta * Owen and Moulds, 2016
 Popplepsalta aeroides Owen and Moulds, 2016 (Blue-banded Scratcher)
 Popplepsalta annulata (Goding and Froggatt, 1904) (Sprinkler Squeaker)
 Popplepsalta ayrensis (Ewart, 1989) (Ephemeral Squeaker)
 Popplepsalta blackdownensis (Popple, 2013) (Blackdown Squeaker)
 Popplepsalta corymbiae (Popple, 2013) (Western Red-eyed Squeaker)
 Popplepsalta decora (Popple, 2013) (Static Squeaker)
 Popplepsalta granitica (Popple, 2013) (Northern Red-eyed Squeaker)
 Popplepsalta inversa (Popple, 2013) (Retro Squeaker)
 Popplepsalta kobongoides (Popple, 2013) (Mimic Squeaker)
 Popplepsalta notialis incitata (Popple, 2013) (Inland Sprinkler Squeaker)
 Popplepsalta notialis notialis (Popple, 2013) (Southern Red-eyed Squeaker)
 Popplepsalta rubristrigata (Goding and Froggatt, 1904) (Red Scratcher)
 Popplepsalta simplex (Popple, 2013) (Atherton Squeaker)
 Popplepsalta subtropica (Popple, 2013) (Subtropical Red-eyed Squeaker)
 Popplepsalta torrensis (Popple, 2013) (Hughenden Red-eyed Squeaker)
 Popplepsalta tremula (Popple, 2013) (Maraca Squeaker)
 Pauropsalta stigmatica Distant, 1905 (Small Adelaide Squeaker)

Genus Punia Moulds, 2012
 Punia minima (Goding and Froggatt, 1904) (Grass Pygmy)

Genus Pyropsalta Moulds, 2012
 Pyropsalta melete (Walker, 1850) (Red Bandit)

Genus Relictapsalta * Owen and Moulds, 2016
 Relictapsalta nigristriga (Goding and Froggatt, 1904) (Dusty Squawker)

Genus Samaecicada* Popple and Emery, 2010
 Samaecicada subolivacea (Ashton, 1912) (Red-eyed Fairy)

Genus Simona Moulds, 2012
 Simona erema Ewart, Popple and Marshall, 2015 (Roaring Senna Cicada)
 Simona retracta Ewart, Popple and Marshall, 2015 (Charleville Eremophila Cicada)
 Simona sancta (Distant, 1913) (Western Eremophila Cicada)

Genus Sylphoides Moulds, 2012
 Sylphoides arenaria (Distant, 1907) (Sand Fairy)

Genus Taurella Moulds, 2012
 Taurella forresti (Distant, 1882) (Hibiscus Cicada)
 Taurella froggatti (Distant, 1907) (Red Fairy)
 Taurella viridis (Ashton, 1912) (Emerald Fairy)

Genus Telmapsalta Moulds, 2012
 Telmapsalta hackeri (Distant, 1915) (Paperbark Cicada)

Genus Terepsalta Moulds, 2012
 Terepsalta infans (Walker, 1850) (Southern Stubby Grass-ticker)
 Terepsalta leichhardti Ewart, 2013 (Northern Stubby Grass-ticker)

Genus Toxala Moulds, 2012
 Toxala verna (Distant, 1912) (Bent-winged Grass-buzzer)
 Toxala mckinnonae Popple, 2015 (Herberton Grass-buzzer)

Genus Urabunana Distant, 1905
 Urabunana sericeivitta (Walker, 1862) (Eastern Grass-buzzer)

Genus Uradolichos Moulds, 2012
 Uradolichos longipennis (Ashton, 1914) (Candy Tiger-squawker)
 Uradolichos rotunda Owen and Moulds, 2016 (Dark Tiger-squawker)

Genus Xeropsalta Ewart, 2018
 Xeropsalta aridula Ewart, 2018 (Simpson Desert Grass-shaker)
 Mugadina festiva (Distant, 1907) (Bee Gleeper)
 Xeropsalta rattrayi Ewart, 2018 (Green Grass-shaker)
 Xeropsalta thomsoni Ewart, 2018 (Birdsville Grass-ticker)

Genus Yoyetta Moulds, 2012
 Yoyetta aaede (Walker, 1850) (Red-eyed Firetail)
 Yoyetta abdominalis (Distant, 1892) (Golden-haired Firetail)
 Yoyetta celis (Moulds, 1988) (Silver Princess)
 Yoyetta cumberlandi Emery, Emery and Popple, 2015 (Cumberland Ambertail)
 Yoyetta denisoni (Distant, 1893) (Black Firetail)
 Yoyetta fluviatilis Emery, Emery and Popple, 2015 (River Ambertail)
 Yoyetta humphreyae Moulds and Popple, 2018 (Varied Ambertail)
 Yoyetta hunterorum (Moulds, 1988) (Sydney Treetop Ticker)
 Yoyetta incepta (Walker, 1850) (False Ambertail)
 Yoyetta landsboroughi (Distant, 1882) (Small Bassian Ambertail)
 Yoyetta nigrimontana Emery, Emery and Popple, 2015 (Small Southern Ambertail)
 Yoyetta repetens Emery, Emery and Popple, 2015 (Zipping Ambertail)
 Yoyetta toowoombae (Distant, 1915) (Small Bassian Ambertail)
 Yoyetta tristrigata (Goding and Froggatt, 1904) (Tropical Ambertail)

Tribe Chlorocystini Distant, 1905

Genus Chlorocysta Westwood, 1851
 Chlorocysta congrua (Walker, 1862) (Small Bottle Cicada)
 Chlorocysta fumea (Ashton, 1914) (McIllwraith Range Bottle Cicada)
 Chlorocysta suffusa (Distant, 1907) (Marbled Bottle Cicada)
 Chlorocysta vitripennis (Westwood, 1851) (Lesser Bottle Cicada)

Genus Cystopsaltria * Goding and Froggatt, 1904
 Cystopsaltria immaculata Goding and Froggatt, 1904 (Rare Bladder Cicada)

Genus Cystosoma Westwood, 1842
 Cystosoma saundersii Westwood, 1842 (Bladder Cicada)
 Cystosoma schmeltzi Distant, 1882 (Small Bladder Cicada)

Genus Euthemopsaltria Moulds, 2014
 Euthemopsaltria laeta Moulds, 2014 (Reticulate Bottle Cicada)

Genus Glaucopsaltria * Goding and Froggatt, 1904
 Glaucopsaltria viridis Goding and Froggatt, 1904 (Bottle Cicada)

Genus Guineapsaltria de Boer, 1993
 Guineapsaltria flava (Goding and Froggatt), 1904 (Green Fairy)

Genus Gymnotympana Stål, 1861
 Gymnotympana rufa (Ashton, 1914) (Crimson Fairy)
 Gymnotympana varicolor (Distant, 1907) (Red Belly)

Genus Owra Ashton, 1912
 Owra insignis Ashton, 1912 (Green Ghost)

Genus Thaumastopsaltria Kirkaldy, 1900
 Thaumastopsaltria globosa (Distant, 1897) (Slender Green Growler)
 Thaumastopsaltria smithersi Moulds, 2012 (Robust Green Growler)

Genus Venustria * Goding and Froggatt, 1904
 Venustria superba Goding and Froggatt, 1904 (Frog Cicada)

Tribe Prasiini Matsumura, 1917

Genus Lembeja Distant, 1883
 Lembeja paradoxa (Karsch, 1890) (Bagpipe Cicada)
 Lembeja vitticollis (Ashton, 1912) (Brown Leaf Cicada)

Tribe Taphurini Distant, 1905

Genus Aleeta Moulds, 2003
 Aleeta curvicosta (Germar, 1834) (Floury Baker)

Genus Tryella Moulds, 2003
 Tryella adela Moulds, 2003 (Small Maroon Bullet)
 Tryella burnsi Moulds, 2003 (Brown Bullet)
 Tryella castanea (Distant, 1905) (Small Rusty Bullet)
 Tryella crassa Moulds, 2003 (Dusky Bullet)
 Tryella graminea Moulds, 2003 (Grass Bullet)
 Tryella infuscata Moulds, 2003 (Large Maroon Bullet)
 Tryella kauma Moulds, 2003 (Silver-striped Bullet)
 Tryella lachlani Moulds, 2003 (Golden Black Bullet)
 Tryella noctua (Distant, 1913) (Chocolate Bullet)
 Tryella occidens Moulds, 2003 (Dusty Brown Bullet)
 Tryella ochra Moulds, 2003 (Golden Brown Bullet)
 Tryella rubra (Goding and Froggatt, 1904) (Large Rusty Bullet)
 Tryella stalkeri (Distant, 1907) (Honey Bullet)
 Tryella willsi (Distant, 1882) (Black Bullet)

Genus Chrysocicada Boulard, 1989
 Chrysocicada franceaustralae Boulard, 1989 (Western Gold Cicada)

Genus Pictila Moulds, 2012
 Pictila occidentalis (Goding and Froggatt, 1904) (Green Mallee Cicada)

Family Tettigarctidae Distant, 1905

Subfamily Tettigarctinae Distant, 1905

Tribe Tettigarctini Distant, 1905

Genus Tettigarcta White, 1845
 Tettigarcta crinita Distant, 1883 (Alpine Hairy Cicada)
 Tettigarcta tomentosa White, 1845 (Tasmanian Hairy Cicada)

See also
An article in the Sydney Morning Herald'' describing Australian cicadas.

References

 
 

Hemiptera of Australia
Cicadas
Cicadas